William Richard Sharpe Jr. (October 28, 1928 – February 16, 2009) was a Democratic member of the West Virginia Senate, representing the 12th district. He was first elected in 1960 and served until 1980. From 1972 to 1980 he served as Majority Whip. He was elected again in 1984 and in 1990 was appointed Senate President Pro Tempore. He is the longest-serving State Senator in West Virginia history, with a career of over 44 years.

In 1994, West Virginia Department of Health and Human Resources opened a new 150 bed acute care psychiatric facility to replace the old Weston State Hospital. The new facility was named William R. Sharpe Jr. Hospital. In 2000 a new Civil Air Patrol facility was built at Charleston's Yeager Airport and it too was named in Sharpe's honor.

In January 2007, Sharpe underwent a 10-hour surgery to treat what doctors called a giant aneurysm. In 2008, Sharpe opted not to seek another term as State Senator. His term expired at the end of December 2008. Sharpe died February 16, 2009.

External links
Ex-W.Va. Senate pro tem Sharpe dies at 80
Follow the Money - William R. Sharpe Jr.
2006 2004 2000 Senate campaign contributions

1928 births
2009 deaths
Democratic Party West Virginia state senators
Politicians from Clarksburg, West Virginia
West Virginia University alumni
People from Weston, West Virginia
Methodists from West Virginia
20th-century American politicians
21st-century American politicians